Harry Robertson may refer to:

 Harry J. Robertson (1896–1962), American football player and coach
 Harry Robertson (folk singer) (1923–1995), Australian folk-singer/songwriter, poet and activist
 Harry Robertson (musician) (1932–1996), Scottish musician
 Harry Robertson (painter) (born 1943)